WNIJ (89.5 FM) is a radio station licensed to DeKalb, Illinois. The station is owned by Northern Illinois University, and is the flagship of Northern Public Radio's  news/talk network, airing NPR news and adult album alternative) music programming.

External links
Northern Public Radio

NIJ
DeKalb, Illinois
Northern Illinois University
NPR member stations
NIJ
Radio stations established in 1954